
Year 815 (DCCCXV) was a common year starting on Monday (link will display the full calendar) of the Julian calendar.

Events 
 By place 
 Byzantine Empire 
 Byzantine–Bulgarian Treaty: Emperor Leo V the Armenian signs a 30-year peace agreement in Constantinople with Omurtag, ruler (khan) of the Bulgarian Empire. The Rhodope Mountains become the Byzantine border again, and Leo regains its lost Black Sea cities, after the Bulgars have them demolished.

 Central America 
April 2 – Sihyaj K'in Ich’aak II becomes the new ruler of the Mayan city state of Machaquila in Guatemala after the death of Ochk'in Kaloomte' Aj Ho' Baak, and reigns until early 824.

 Europe 
 Hrafna-Flóki Vilgerðarson sets out from the Faroe Islands and discovers Iceland (documented later in the Landnámabók) (approximate date).

 Britain 
 King Egbert of Wessex ravages the territories of the remaining British kingdom Dumnonia, known as the West Welsh (Cornwall).

 Asia 
 Emperor Saga of Japan is the first sovereign to drink tea (according to legend), imported from China by monks. The upper classes adopt this beverage for medicinal use.
 July 13 – Wu Yuanheng, Chinese chancellor of the Tang Dynasty, is murdered by assassins of warlord Wu Yuanji, in Chang'an.

 By topic 
 Religion 
 Synod of Constantinople: A council led by patriarch Theodotus I, in the Hagia Sophia, reinstitutes iconoclasm.

Births 
 Abu Hanifa Dinawari, Muslim botanist and geographer (d. 896) 
 Boniface VI, pope of the Catholic Church (d. 896)
 Dawud al-Zahiri, Muslim scholar (approximate date)
 Eberhard, duke of Friuli (approximate date)
 Johannes Scotus Eriugena, Irish theologian (approximate date)
 Leoluca, Sicilian abbot (approximate date)
 Methodius, Byzantine missionary and bishop (d. 885)
 Theodora, Byzantine empress (approximate date)

Deaths 
 February 15 – Ibn Tabataba, Zaydi anti-caliph
 July 13 – Wu Yuanheng, chancellor of the Tang Dynasty (b. 758)
 October 18 – Abu'l-Saraya, Zaydi rebel leader
 Jābir ibn Hayyān (Geber), Muslim alchemist (approximate date)
 Laylā bint Ṭarīf, Arab woman warrior poet
 Mashallah ibn Athari, Jewish-Arab astrologer 
 Muirgius mac Tommaltaig, king of Connacht (Ireland)
 Omar Tiberiades, Persian astrologer (approximate date)
 Sadnalegs, emperor of Tibet (approximate date)

References